Monegrillo is a municipality located in the province of Zaragoza, Aragon, Spain. According to the 2009 census (INE), the town has a population of 495 inhabitants. The Postal Code is 50164

The Sierra de Alcubierre rises east of the town.

References

Municipalities in the Province of Zaragoza